An article or piece is a written work published in a print or electronic medium. It may be for the purpose of propagating news, research results, academic analysis, or debate.

News articles

A news article discusses current or recent news of either general interest (i.e. daily newspapers) or of a specific topic (i.e. political or trade news magazines, club newsletters, or technology news websites).

A news article can include accounts of eyewitnesses to the happening event. It can contain photographs, accounts, statistics, graphs, recollections, interviews, polls, debates on the topic, etc. Headlines can be used to focus the reader's attention on a particular (or main) part of the article. The writer can also give facts and detailed information following answers to general questions like who, what, when, where, why and how.

Quoted references can also be helpful. References to people can also be made through the written accounts of interviews and debates confirming the factuality of the writer's information and the reliability of his source. The writer can use redirection to ensure that the reader keeps reading the article and to draw her attention to other articles. For example, phrases like "Continued on page 3" redirect the reader to a page where the article is continued.

While a good conclusion is an important ingredient for newspaper articles, the immediacy of a deadline environment means that copy editing occasionally takes the form of deleting everything past an arbitrary point in the story corresponding to the dictates of available space on a page. Therefore, newspaper reporters are trained to write in inverted pyramid style, with all the most important information in the first paragraph or two. If the less vital details are pushed towards the end of the story, then the potentially destructive impact of draconian copy editing will be minimized.

Scholarly article

Electronic article 
Electronic articles are articles in scholarly journals or magazines  that can be accessed via electronic transmission. They are a specialized form of electronic document, with a specialized content, purpose, format, metadata, and availability   they consist of individual articles from scholarly journals or  magazines (and now sometimes popular magazines), they have the purpose of providing material for academic research and study, they are formatted approximately like printed journal articles, the metadata is entered into specialized databases, such as the Directory of Open Access Journals as well as the databases for the discipline, and they are predominantly available through academic libraries and special libraries, generally at a fixed charge.

Electronic articles can be found in online-only journals (par excellence), but in the 21st century they have also become common as online versions of articles that also appear in printed journals. The practice of publishing of an electronic version of an article before it later appears in print is sometimes called epub ahead of print, particularly in PubMed, or simply ahead of print (AOP) or advanced online publication in the context of CrossRef.

The term can also be used for the electronic versions of less formal publications, such as online archives, working paper archives from universities, government agencies, private and public think tanks and institutes and private websites. In many academic areas, specialized bibliographic databases are available to find their online content.

Most commercial sites are subscription-based, or allow pay-per-view access. Many universities subscribe to electronic journals to provide access to their students and faculty, and it is generally also possible for individuals to subscribe. An increasing number of journals are now available with open access, requiring no subscription. Most working paper archives and articles on personal homepages are free, as are collections in institutional repositories and subject repositories.

The most common formats of transmission are HTML, PDF and, in specialized fields like mathematics and physics, TeX and PostScript.

See also
 Academic publishing
 Article directory
 Electronic article
 Electronic journal
 Eprint
 Preprint
 Postprint
 Scholarly article
 Scientific article

References

Writing
Narratology
Publishing